The American Red Cross and the Federal Emergency Management Agency (FEMA) together developed the National Shelter System (NSS). Under the National Response Plan now called the National Response Framework auspices,  American Red Cross, is the Co-Primary Agency with FEMA responsible for the Mass Care portion of Emergency Support Function #6 - Mass Care, Temporary Housing and Human Services.

The goal of the NSS is to be able to identify the location, managing agency, capacity, current population, needs assessment and other relevant information for all shelters being run during the response to incidents.

History 
Then National Shelter System was developed in 2009 by FEMA and the American Red Cross. The goal of the NSS is to provide a planning and operational framework to disaster relief groups. Since it has become operational, access to the NSS has been offered to states who are now able to use it to plan for disaster relief. The NSS offers a directory of possible shelter locations and provides disaster relief managers with tools to help them help more people.

References

American Red Cross
Federal Emergency Management Agency